Ephraim Edward Ericksen (January 2, 1882–1967) was an American philosopher and Mormon scholar who taught philosophy at the University of Utah for 30 years. He was a president of the American Philosophical Association, and is known as an influential figure in LDS intellectual history. The University of Utah E. E. Ericksen Chair of Philosophy was established in his honor in 1965.

References

External links

1882 births
1967 deaths
University of Utah faculty
20th-century American philosophers
People from Logan, Utah
Latter Day Saints from Utah
University of Chicago alumni
Latter Day Saint philosophers